Alveolinella is a genus of larger fusiform porcelaneous alveolinids from the Miocene to Recent with apertures on the septal face in multiple rows and aligned partitions (septula) dividing the primary chambers. Aveolinella is a larger foraminifer from the milioline family Alveolinidae. Like other miliolines, they have imperforate porcelaneous walls.

In the Pacific Ocean Alveolinella is found between water depths of 10 to 80 m, often associated with other miliolids, in carbonate areas of warm tropical seas. Its nearest living relative is the genus Borelis de Montfort.

References 

 Alfred R. Loeblich Jr and Helen Tappan, 1964, Treatise on Invertebrate Paleontology, Part C, Protista 2; Geological Society of America and University of Kansas Press.
 
 

Tubothalamea
Foraminifera genera
Extant Miocene first appearances